Gerhard Eichhorn (3 May 1927 – 15 December 2015) was a German graphic artist, painter and draughtsman.

Life 
From 1950 to 1955, he studied graphic design at the Hochschule für Grafik und Buchkunst Leipzig under Elisabeth Voigt, Heinz Eberhard Strüning and Heinz Wagner. From 1959 to 1964, he was a teacher at the Leipzig College of Applied Arts, and from 1966 to 1992, he was a lecturer at the Leipzig College of Graphic Arts and Book Art, as well as head of the workshop for etchings and copperplate engraving. From 1968, he was also head of the painting and graphic arts department. From 1976, he was vice-rector and from 1978, associate professor of this teaching institution.

Eichorn died at the age of 88.

Work 
In 1965, he designed the bar of the Hotel Deutschland in Leipzig with a mural. Influenced by Käthe Kollwitz, he created the graphic cycles: "From the Struggle of the Working Class" and "The German Peasant War".

Honours 
 1969 
 1987 Vaterländischer Verdienstorden in Silver

Exhibitions

Personal exhibition 
 1975 Brandenburg
 1976, 1977 and 1979 Leipzig
 also in Kiev, Krakow, Lyon, Moscow, Parma, Tallinn, Vienna.

Exhibition participations 
 1958, 1962, 1967, 1972 and 1977 
 since 1955 District Art Exhibition Leipzig

Further reading 
 Eichhorn, Gerhard. In Hans Vollmer (ed.): Allgemeines Lexikon der bildenden Künstler des XX. Jahrhunderts. Band 5: V–Z. Nachträge: A–G. E. A. Seemann, Leipzig 1961, .
 
 Dietmar Eisold (ed.): Lexikon Künstler in der DDR. Neues Leben, Berlin 2010, .
 Ullrich Kuhirt, Christine Hoffmeister: Kunst in der DDR, Plastik, Malerei, Grafik. 1949–1959. Verlag der Kunst, Dresden 1959.

References

External links 
 

20th-century German painters
20th-century German male artists
German draughtsmen
German art educators
Recipients of the Patriotic Order of Merit in silver
1927 births
2015 deaths
People from Sonneberg (district)